Gary Fusco (born 1 June 1982) is a Scottish professional footballer who plays as a midfielder. Fusco previously played for Cowdenbeath, Forfar Athletic, and had two spells with Brechin City.

Career statistics

References

1982 births
Living people
Scottish footballers
Cowdenbeath F.C. players
Forfar Athletic F.C. players
Brechin City F.C. players
Scottish Professional Football League players
Association football midfielders